Lesbian, gay, bisexual, and transgender (LGBT) persons in  Mali face legal challenges not experienced by non-LGBT residents. LGBT persons face stigmatization among the broader population. According to the 2007 Pew Global Attitudes Project, 98 percent of Malian adults believe that homosexuality is a way of life that society should not accept, which was the highest rate of non-acceptance in the 45 countries surveyed.

Law regarding same-sex sexual activity

Private, adult, consensual and non-commercial homosexuality is legal in Mali.

The age of consent is set at 15 years.

Article 179 of the penal code punishes acts of "public indecency" with fines and imprisonment. This has sometimes been used against LGBT people who engage in public displays of affection.

While technically legal, the prevailing cultural and religious beliefs of most Mali citizens view same-sex sexual activity and non-traditional gender roles as immoral.

Discrimination protections

There are no anti-discrimination laws to protect the LGBT community from harassment and abuse on the basis of sexual orientation and gender identity. Also, societal discrimination is widespread.

Adoption and family planning

Article 522 of the "Code des Personnes et de la Famille", which was passed by the National Assembly on 2 December 2011 and subsequently signed into the law by the president of Mali, forbids same-sex couples from adopting children.

Living conditions
According to Dr. Dembelé Bintou Keita, the director of ARCAD/SIDA, an HIV/AIDS organization in Mali that provides health care for men who have sex with men (MSM), Malian society is not tolerant to MSM. They "have no rights and certainly no right to claim their sexual orientation. All cultural beliefs towards MSM are negative." MSM are forced into bisexuality or underground sexual practices that put them at high risk of sexually transmitted and HIV infections. "Men who are attracted to other men are forced to get married so that they will not bring shame to the family ... but they still have men as sexual partners."

The U.S. Department of State's 2011 human rights report found that,

There were no publicly visible lesbian, gay, bisexual, and transgender (LGBT) organizations in the country. The free association of LGBT organizations was impeded by a law prohibiting association "for an immoral purpose"; in 2005 the then governor of the District of Bamako cited this law to refuse official recognition to a gay rights association.

Summary table

See also

Human rights in Mali
LGBT rights in Africa

References

Law of Mali
Mali
Human rights in Mali
Politics of Mali
LGBT in Mali